Hsu Kuang-han (born October 31, 1990), known professionally as Greg Hsu and Greg Han, is a Taiwanese actor and singer. He was nominated for two Golden Bell Awards for his roles in the television series Have You ever Fallen in Love, Miss Jiang? (2016) and Someday or One Day (2019–2020). He also appeared in the television series Love of Sandstorm (2016) and Nowhere Man (2019), as well as the films A Sun (2019) and My Love (2021). In 2020, he entered the Forbes China Celebrity 100 list for the first time, ranking 69th.

Hsu released his debut single "Yesterday No More" in 2020 and the next year he released his self-titled debut studio album. In 2022, he was nominated for Best New Artist at Golden Melody Awards.

Career
In 2013, Hsu made his television debut in the Malaysian drama series Dive into Love. In 2015, he studied acting at Q Place, a drama academy established by director Wang Shaudi. He followed this appearing in well-received series Love of Sandstorm and Have You ever Fallen in Love, Miss Jiang? in which he was nominated Best Supporting Actor at the 52nd Golden Bell Awards. Hsu also made stunning performances in Netflix's Nowhere Man and Oscar short-listed A Sun.  In 2019, he starred as leading actor in hit series  Someday or One Day. The popular series got him nominated for Best Leading Actor at the 55th Golden Bell Awards, and made him now one of the most sought-after young actors in Asia. In 2020, he released single "Yesterday No More". The song immediately landed No. 1 on KKBox charts in Taiwan, Hong Kong, Singapore and Malaysia.

Personal life 
In March 2021, Hsu expressed support for Xinjiang cotton when international apparel brands have expressed concern over the human rights situation in Xinjiang and stopped sourcing cotton from there.

Endorsements 
On July 14, 2022, Italian luxury fashion house Fendi officially announced that Greg became the brand ambassador.

Filmography

Film

Television

Music videos

Discography 
Studio album
 Greg Han (2021)

Accolades

References

External links

 
 
 
 
 
 Greg Han on Spotify
 Greg Han on Apple Music

1990 births
Living people
21st-century Taiwanese male actors
Taiwanese male television actors
Taiwanese male film actors
21st-century Taiwanese male singers